Nurlan Orynbasaruly Dulatbekov (Nurlan Orynbasaruly Dýlatbekov; born on May 5, 1962, in Aksu–Ayuly village of Shet District, Karagandy Province, the Kazakh SSR); since 1996 - the Chancellor of  Karagandy “Bolashak” University. A Kazakhstan scientist in the field of criminal law and criminology, an outstanding figure in the education system of the Republic of Kazakhstan, Doctor of Law (2003), Professor (2004).

Biography
In 1984 he graduated with honours from Karaganda State University named after E.A. Buketov. Being a student he took an active part in social life of the university, in the province and Republic. He was rewarded with the diploma of the Central Committee of L.Y.C.L.S.U. (Leninist Young Communist League of the Soviet Union) and that of the Leninist Young Communist League of Kazakhstan. He was elected as a delegate of the thirteenth Worldwide youth and students’ festival in Korea. As a commander he headed the Republican building troop "Kazakhstan" which in 1988 took the first place among fifteen thousand building troops of the USSR. After graduating from the university he passed military service at the military tribunal of the Alma-Aty garrison.

In 1992 as a member of a group of young scientists he was accepted by the President Nursultan Abishevich Nazarbayev and sent to Turkey universities to pass a scientific – pedagogical period of trainee. From 1986 to 1989 he worked as a lecturer, in 1993 – as a senior lecturer, from 1993 to 1996 –  as an assistant professor and the head of the department of the law faculty of Karagandy State University. From 1994 to 1997 he passed scientific – pedagogical training in the universities of England, France, Belgium, Spain and Malaysia.
From 1996 by now he is the Chancellor of Karaganda “Bolashak” University.

Married. The father of two sons and a daughter.

Scientific activity 
Studying at the graduate school (1989–1992) he was a holder of a research grant named after Akhmet Baitursynov.
In March 1993 at the Dissertational Council of the Kazakh University of Labour Red Order Banner named after Al – Farabi he defended a dissertation on achieving the scientific degree of  Candidate of Law on the theme “Individualization of criminal penalty for the crimes against life” . He was a holder of a scientific grant for talented young scientists founded by the president of the Republic of Kazakhstan.
In February 1995 he was conferred an academic status of an assistant professor (reader) in the field of jurisprudence.
In May 2003 he defended a dissertation on the theme “Theory and practice of imposing a penalty” on achieving the scientific degree of  Doctor of Law on the speciality “Jurisprudence” . In 2004 he was conferred an academic status of a Professor in the field of law sciences by the Highest Certification Commission of the Republic of Kazakhstan .
He was elected as a member-correspondent of the International Personnel academy (the Ukraine), a member-correspondent of the Academy of social sciences (Kazakhstan), an academician of the International Slavonic academy of Education named after J.A. Komensky (Moldova), an academician of the Academy of pedagogical sciences of Kazakhstan.

The author of more than 110 works:
 Chrestomathy on the history of state and law of the Republic of Kazakhstan.  5 volumes. – Karaganda: Bolashak – Baspa, 1994–2000. – total volume – 603 p. – .
 Dulatbekov N.O. Dictionary of law terms. – Almaty: Zheti – Zhargy, 1996.
 Dulatbeov N., Taishybay Z. Zhakyp Akbaev. Monography. – Almaty: Zheti – Zhargy, 1997. – 90 p.
 Dulatbekov N.O. Crime and penalty. Entertaining practice on the General part of the Criminal law. – Karaganda: Bolashak – Baspa, 1999. – 96 pages. – 200 copies. – 
 Dulatbekov N.O., Amandykova S.K., Turlaev A.V. The fundamentals of the theory of state and law in the Republic of Kazakhstan: a teaching aid. – Astana: Foliant, 2000. – 284 p.
 Dulatbekov N.O. Theory and Practice of penalty imposing =  Қылмыстық жаза тағайындау (теория және практика мәселелері). – Astana: Foliant, 2002. – 446  p. – 
 Dulatbekov N.O., Kruglikov L.L. The problems of differentiation and individualization of responsibility and penalty (on the example of analysis of economic crimes). – Karaganda: Karaganda State University, 2001. – 159 p.- 
 Kruglikov L.L., Dulatbekov N.O. Economic crimes (questions of differentiation and individualization of responsibility and penalty). – Yaroslavl: Yaroslavl State University, 2001.-217 p. – 
 Dulatbekov N.O., Bekbergenov N.A. Imposing penalty according to cumulative crime. – Karaganda: Bolashak – Baspa, 2002. – 200 p. 
 Dulatbekov N.O. Common law of the Kazakhs. (The chrestomathy on the history of state and law). – Astana: “Adilet”, 2006. – 236 p.- 
 Dulatbekov N.O., Syzdyk B.K., Bievaeva A.A. Қылмыстық заңнаманы мәтіндік сараптау тәжірибесі ( Experience of textological examination of the criminal legislation). – Karaganda: Bolashak – Baspa, 2008. – 184 p. 
 Juvenology. The text-book for the students of higher educational institutions / edited by Dulatbekov N.O. – Almaty: Zheti-Zhargy, 2008. – 424 p. – 2000 copies.
 Dulatbekov N.O., Zhumadilova N.T. Karlag: creativity in captivity. Artists, museums, documents, monuments. (in the Russian, Kazakh and English languages). – Karaganda, 2009.- 243 p. –

Political activity 
He is a member of the Kazakhstan national-democratic party “Nur Otan”. Since 2005 - a coordinator of the Centre of Regional Headquarters of the party “Nur Otan”.
Since 2007 - a deputy of the Karagandy regional maslihat on legality and human rights. He was awarded  two thank letters of the President of the Republic of Kazakhstan N.A. Nazarbaev.

Notes 
 Graduates are our pride! Karaganda State University named after E.A. Buketov. Retrieved on May 27, 2010.
 “Leninskaya smena/Lenin shift” newspaper, the article “Answer to our pain and joy. About the delegate of the Worldwide festival” from 30.06.1989
 “Komsomolskaya Pravda. Sobesednik” newspaper. The article “The five from 650 000”  from 18.04.1989
 Decision of the Higher Certificate Commission (HCC) of the Republic of Kazakhstan. The certificate of Candidate of Law, given by the Specialized Dissertation Council attached to the Kazakh State National University named after Al-Farabi, series ҒК № 0000636  March 4, 1993.
 Decision of the Higher Certificate Commission (HCC) of the Republic of Kazakhstan. The certificate of Professor of Law ДЦ № 0001385  February 17, 1995
 Decision of the Higher Certificate Commission (HCC) of the Republic of Kazakhstan. The certificate of Doctor of Law, series ҒД № 0003351  January 29, 2004 (proceedings № 1).
 Decision of the Higher Certificate Commission (HCC) of the Republic of Kazakhstan. The certificate of Professor of Law, series ПФ № 0003351  October 28, 2004 (proceedings № 8).

References 

 Leaders of the regional branches of party “Nur Otan” (2009). Retrieved on April 18, 2010.
 The nominees for the prize “Golden heart/Altyn Zhurek- 2009”. 2008. Retrieved on April 18, 2010.
 The scientific library of the Eastern -Kazakhstan University named after S. Amanzholov (2002–2010). Retrieved on April 18, 2010.
 The Institute of legal and comparative investigations is established in Kazakhstan (2009). Retrieved on April 18, 2010.
 The Social Council on controlling police activity (2008). Retrieved on April 18, 2010.
 The Chancellor/Head of KU “Bolashak” (2008). Retrieved on April 18, 2010.

Heads of universities in Kazakhstan
People from Karaganda Region
1962 births
Living people
Kazakhstani lawyers